Philodromus rodecki is a species of running crab spider in the family Philodromidae. It is found in the United States and Canada.

References

rodecki
Articles created by Qbugbot
Spiders described in 1939